St. Louis Blues (retitled as Best of the Blues) is a 1939 American musical film directed by Raoul Walsh and set on a Mississippi River showboat. Though the song "St. Louis Blues" is performed, the film's plot is not based on the song. Artists appearing in the film include jazz singer Maxine Sullivan and composer/singer/actor Hoagy Carmichael. The film stars Dorothy Lamour, Lloyd Nolan, Tito Guízar, Jerome Cowan and Mary Parker.

Lamour sings "I Go for That" by Matt Malneck, Jr. and Frank Loesser in the film, and it became a hit recording.

Plot
A Broadway performer befriends a showboat skipper and they stage a musical revue. Competition from a carnival owner soon becomes a threat to their dreams.

Cast

 Dorothy Lamour as Norma Malone
 Lloyd Nolan as Dave Geurney
 Tito Guízar as Rafael San Ramos
 Jerome Cowan as Ivan DeBrett
 Jessie Ralph as Aunt Tibbie
 William Frawley as Maj. Martingale
 Mary Parker as Punkins
 Maxine Sullivan as Ida
 Cliff Nazarro as Shorty
 Victor Kilian as Sheriff Burdick
 Walter Soderling as Mr. Hovey
 The King's Men as Themselves
 Virginia Howell as Mrs. Hovey
 Matty Malneck as Himself (Orchestra Leader)
 Emory Parnell as Policeman White

George Raft was offered the lead role, but he refused and was replaced by Nolan.

References

External links

1939 films
1939 musical comedy films
American black-and-white films
American musical comedy films
Paramount Pictures films
Films directed by Raoul Walsh
1930s English-language films
1930s American films